Weightlifting at the 1980 Summer Olympics was represented by ten events (all — men's individual), held between 20 and 30 July at the Izmailovo Sports Palace, situated alongside the Izmailovo Park (eastern part of Moscow).

Medal summary

Medal table

Results

52 kg

56 kg

60 kg

67.5 kg

75 kg

82.5 kg

90 kg

100 kg

110 kg

+110 kg

Remarks:
All weights are given in kilograms
WR=World Record, OR=Olympic Record, JWR=Junior World Record
Country names in the medal table are not given in the form they were used in the official documents of the IOC in 1980

References

External links
Official Olympic Report 

 
1980 Summer Olympics events
1980
1980 in weightlifting